The 2011 Championship League Darts was the fourth edition of a darts competition — the Championship League Darts. The competition was organized and held by the Professional Darts Corporation, with the 2011 edition having a maximum prize fund of £189,000.

The format of the tournament was similar to the Premier League Darts tournament, also organized by the PDC, except it was contested by a larger pool of players who were split up into a number of groups.

Every match could be watched on one of the thirty bookmaker websites who broadcast the competition. The tournament was available globally through the internet, except in the United States of America where it could not be shown for legal reasons.

Format
The first group consisted of the top eight players from the PDC Order of Merit who were available for the competition. These eight players played each other over the course of a day, receiving two points for each win. All matches were contested over a maximum of 11 legs with a player winning the match on reaching 6 legs. After all players had played each other, the four players with the most points progressed to the semi-finals with the winners of those matches progressing into the final.

The winner of the final progressed to the winners group which took place at the end of the competition. The runner-up, losing semi-finalists and the players finishing fifth and sixth moved into group two, where they were joined by the next three players in the Order of Merit. The format of the second group was the same as the first group with players moving into the third group. In total there were 8 groups before the final group took place.

This format ensures that all players who do not win the group or finish in the last two positions have another chance to qualify for the winners group.

Tournament dates
The tournament took place over 9 days throughout September and October 2010. One group was played on each day. The dates were as follows:

Group 1 – Tuesday 27 September
Group 2 – Wednesday 28 September
Group 3 – Thursday 29 September
Group 4 – Tuesday 11 October
Group 5 – Wednesday 12 October
Group 6 – Thursday 13 October
Group 7 – Tuesday 18 October
Group 8 – Wednesday 19 October
Winners Group – Thursday 20 October

The tournament took place at the Crondon Park Golf Club in Essex.

Group 1

 Phil Taylor
 Adrian Lewis
 James Wade
 Gary Anderson
 Simon Whitlock
 Wes Newton
 Mark Webster
 Terry Jenkins

Group 2

 Phil Taylor
 James Wade
 Simon Whitlock
 Wes Newton
 Mark Webster
 Paul Nicholson
 Andy Hamilton
 Mervyn King

Group 3

 Simon Whitlock
 Wes Newton
 Paul Nicholson
 Andy Hamilton
 Mervyn King
 Wayne Jones
 Mark Walsh
 Colin Lloyd

Group 4

 Simon Whitlock
 Mervyn King
 Wayne Jones
 Mark Walsh
 Colin Lloyd
 Ronnie Baxter
 Vincent van der Voort
 Jamie Caven

Group 5

 Simon Whitlock
 Mervyn King
 Colin Lloyd
 Vincent van der Voort
 Jamie Caven
 Andy Smith
 Colin Osborne
 Kevin Painter

Group 6

 Simon Whitlock
 Vincent van der Voort
 Andy Smith
 Colin Osborne
 Kevin Painter
 Denis Ovens
 Alan Tabern
 Steve Beaton

Group 7

 Vincent van der Voort
 Andy Smith
 Steve Beaton
 Alan Tabern
 Kevin Painter
 Co Stompé
 Robert Thornton
 Mark Dudbridge
 John Part

Group 8

 Vincent van der Voort
 Alan Tabern
 Kevin Painter
 Mark Dudbridge
 John Part
 Steve Brown
 Dennis Priestley
 Jelle Klaasen

Co Stompe withdrew following group 6 due to injury. As a consequence John Part was moved from starting in group 8 to group 7 and Jelle Klaasen was added as a replacement in group 8.

Group winners in bold, players eliminated in italic

Group stage

Group 1
Played Tuesday 27 September, group 1 was won by Gary Anderson. Terry Jenkins and reigning world champion Adrian Lewis were knocked out.

Group 2
Played on 28 September 2011 group 2 was won by world number one Phil Taylor. James Wade and Mark Webster were eliminated.

Group 3
Group 3 was played on 29 September 2011 and won by Paul Nicholson. Andy Hamilton and Wes Newton were eliminated.

Group 4
Group 4 was played on 11 October 2011 and won by Mark Walsh. Ronnie Baxter and Wayne Jones were eliminated.

Group 5
Group 5 was played on 12 October 2011 and won by Mervyn King. Colin Lloyd and Jamie Caven were eliminated. In the group phase Simon Whitlock achieved a nine dart finish checking out 144 with double 18.

Group 6
Group 6 was played on 13 October 2011 and won by Simon Whitlock, who finally won after reaching all five preceding play-offs. Denis Ovens and Colin Osborne were eliminated.

Group 7
Group 7 was played on 18 October 2011 and won by Steve Beaton. Andy Smith and Robert Thornton were eliminated.

Group 8
Group 8 was played on 19 October 2011 and won by Dennis Priestley. As this was the last group all other seven participants missed out on qualifying to the winners group.

Winners Group
The winners group was played on 20 October 2011 and won by Phil Taylor, who in the group phase achieved the second nine dart finish of the tournament by checking out 141 with double 12.

Coverage
The tournament was streamed worldwide through the PDC website. It was also streamed through thirty bookmaker websites.

References

Championship League Darts
Championship League
Championship League Darts